A bricklayer, which is related to but different from a mason, is a craftsman and tradesman who lays bricks to construct brickwork. The terms also refer to personnel who use blocks to construct blockwork walls and other forms of masonry. In British and Australian English, a bricklayer is colloquially known as a "brickie". A stone mason is one who lays any combination of stones, cinder blocks, and bricks in construction of building walls and other works. Bricklaying is a part of masonry.

Bricklaying may also be enjoyed as a hobby. For example, the former British Prime Minister Winston Churchill did bricklaying as a hobby.

Bricklayers occasionally enter competitions where both speed and accuracy are judged. The largest is the "Spec-Mix Bricklayer 500" held annually in Las Vegas, Nevada, USA.

Required training
Bricklaying and masonry are ancient professions that even centuries later require modern training. Bricklayers usually go through a formal apprenticeship which includes about three to four years of on-the-job training combined with classroom instruction. Unions and many employers offer these apprenticeships. To become an apprentice, one must be at least 16 years old (United Kingdom) and have graduated from high school/senior school. Masons must attend trade school and/or serve apprenticeships requiring that they demonstrate that they know how to protect homes from humidity or water ingress, know about thermal insulation, and know about the science of construction material and occupational health and safety. While some online sites say they can get you certified in as few as 30 days, most bricklayers today attend trade or technical schools and receive in-depth and thorough training.

In fiction

 Italian-American author John Fante featured hod carriers, bricklayers, and stonemasons prominently in several novels and short stories. This was due to the autobiographical nature of much of Fante's writing; his father, Nick, was an Italian-born bricklayer descended from — at least in Fante's fictions — a long line of Italian artisan bricklayers and stonemasons. Fante also spent a significant portion of his youth apprenticed to his father.
 In Aleksandr Solzhenitsyn's One Day in the Life of Ivan Denisovich, the title character, a Gulag prisoner, worked as a bricklayer.
 The long-running British children's TV series Look and Read featured "Bill the Brickie" ("brickie" being a British and Australian colloquialism for "bricklayer"), who would 'build' words with bricks to demonstrate the use of morphemes, such as '-ed' or '-ing'.

See also
 Brick hod
 Construction
 Guild
 Stonemasonry

References

.
Artisans
Construction trades workers
Crafts
.